Ricardo Bellveser Icardo (27 November 1948 – 29 December 2021) was a Spanish writer, poet, and journalist. He wrote articles for Spanish and Latin American newspapers and magazines.

References

1948 births
2021 deaths
Spanish journalists
Spanish writers
People from Valencia